Platyptilia charadrias is a moth of the family Pterophoridae. It is found in New Zealand, where it is known from the high mountains of the South Island's main divide.

The larvae possibly feed on Cassinia species.

References

Moths described in 1884
charadrias
Endemic fauna of New Zealand
Moths of New Zealand
Endemic moths of New Zealand